The Nicolaus-Copernicus-Gesamtausgabe (Nicolaus Copernicus Complete Edition) is a comprehensive, commented collection of works by, about, and related to Nicolaus Copernicus. The Gesamtausgabe includes Copernicus's surviving manuscripts and notes, his published writings, other authors' commentary about Copernicus and his works, a bibliography, and a biography.
 
Compilation of the series began in 1973 to commemorate the 500th anniversary of Copernicus's birth. The first volume is the astronomer's landmark work, De revolutionibus orbium coelestium (On the Revolutions of the Heavenly Spheres), which expounded Copernicus's heliocentric theory of the universe. The set is published by Akademie Verlag in Berlin, Germany.

Volumes 
I:      De revolutionibus orbium coelestium, 1974, 
II:     
III/1:  Kommentar zu "De revolutionibus", 1998, 
III/3:  De Revolutionibus. Die erste deutsche Übersetzung in der Grazer Handschrift, 2007, 
IV:     
V:      Opera Minora 1999, 
VI/1:   Documenta Copernicana, 1994, 
VI/2:   Documenta Copernicana, 1996, 
VII:    
VIII/1: Receptio Copernicana, 
IX:     Biographia Copernicana

External links
Nicolaus Copernicus Gesamtausgabe at Akademie Verlag

Science books
Nicolaus Copernicus